Willie Nimmo (1934 – 1991) was a Scottish footballer, who played for Alloa Athletic in the Scottish Football League, and Leeds United and Doncaster Rovers in the Football League.

References

1934 births
1991 deaths
Scottish footballers
Footballers from South Lanarkshire
Association football goalkeepers
Scottish Football League players
English Football League players
Alloa Athletic F.C. players
Leeds United F.C. players
Doncaster Rovers F.C. players
Mansfield Town F.C. players